Waverly is a city in Lafayette County, Missouri, and part of the Kansas City metropolitan area within the United States. The population was 849 at the 2010 census.

Waverly is the location of Baltimore Bend Winery, one of the many small wineries established in the state since the 1960s. The Waverly Bridge over the Missouri River is located near here.
It is also home to Captain Jo Shelby, a hemp farmer who joined the Confederate cause in 1861.

History
Waverly was founded in the 1840s. The community was named after Waverly, Illinois, the native home of an early settler. A post office called Waverly has been in operation since 1854.

The Napoleon Buck House was listed on the National Register of Historic Places in 1997.

Geography
Waverly is located at  (39.208082, -93.520559).

Demographics

2010 census
As of the census of 2010, there were 849 people, 317 households, and 215 families living in the city. The racial makeup of the city was 94.5% White, 2.1% African American, 0.2% Native American, 0.2% Asian, 2.1% from other races, and 0.8% from two or more races. Hispanic or Latino of any race were 6.1% of the population.

There were 317 households, of which 31.5% had children under the age of 18 living with them, 57.1% were married couples living together, 7.3% had a female householder with no husband present, 3.5% had a male householder with no wife present, and 32.2% were non-families. 27.8% of all households were made up of individuals, and 15.4% had someone living alone who was 65 years of age or older. The average household size was 2.44 and the average family size was 3.01.

The median age in the city was 40.6 years. 28.4% of residents were under the age of 18; 4.7% were between the ages of 18 and 24; 21.6% were from 25 to 44; 26.2% were from 45 to 64; and 18.8% were 65 years of age or older. The gender makeup of the city was 51.6% male and 48.4% female.

2000 census
As of the census of 2000, there were 806 people, 314 households, and 204 families living in the city. The population density was 806.8 people per square mile (311.2/km). There were 369 housing units at an average density of 369.4 per square mile (142.5/km). The racial makeup of the city was 97.15% White, 0.74% African American, 0.12% Native American, 0.12% Asian, 0.50% from other races, and 1.36% from two or more races. Hispanic or Latino of any race were 1.24% of the population.

There were 314 households, out of which 26.8% had children under the age of 18 living with them, 55.1% were married couples living together, 7.3% had a female householder with no husband present, and 35.0% were non-families. 31.8% of all households were made up of individuals, and 16.9% had someone living alone who was 65 years of age or older. The average household size was 2.33 and the average family size was 2.93.

In the city the population was spread out, with 26.6% under the age of 18, 6.1% from 18 to 24, 22.8% from 25 to 44, 24.2% from 45 to 64, and 20.3% who were 65 years of age or older. The median age was 41 years. For every 100 females, there were 102.0 males. For every 100 females age 18 and over, there were 86.8 males.

The median income for a household in the city was $36,806, and the median income for a family was $43,654. Males had a median income of $30,729 versus $22,813 for females. The per capita income for the city was $17,066. About 7.1% of families and 10.4% of the population were below the poverty line, including 13.3% of those under age 18 and 11.5% of those age 65 or over.

Education
Santa Fe R-X School District operates one school at Waverly: Santa Fe Elementary School.

Waverly has a public library, a branch of the Trails Regional Library.

References

External links
 Historic maps of Waverly in the Sanborn Maps of Missouri Collection at the University of Missouri

Cities in Lafayette County, Missouri
Missouri populated places on the Missouri River
Cities in Missouri